Andrew James Richmond (1832 – 15 November 1880) was a 19th-century Member of Parliament in Nelson, New Zealand.

He was the son of Major Mathew Richmond, Member of the Legislative Council (1853–1887). In 1856, he married Anna Selina Richmond (née Blundell) at Nelson, oldest daughter of Captain Francis H. Blundell.  They were to have one son and three daughters.

As a public servant he was the second Clerk of the Executive Council. He then represented the Collingwood electorate from 1861 to 1868, when he resigned.

His death on 15 November 1880 at age 48 was sudden and was attributed to heart disease. He died while at home on his farm Richmond Brook at Awatere, Marlborough. He had managed Richmond Brook for his father. He was survived by his wife.

References

|-

1832 births
1880 deaths
Members of the New Zealand House of Representatives
New Zealand MPs for South Island electorates
19th-century New Zealand politicians